Edhuvas En'buri Annaanenama is a Maldivian social drama television series written and directed by Fathimath Nahula. It stars Yoosuf Shafeeu, Jamsheedha Ahmed and Mohamed Manik in main roles while Koyya Hassan Manik and Aminath Rasheedha appears in supporting roles. The series consisting of five episodes revolves around three friends who failed in love choose a destructive path and later hoping to redeem themselves.

Cast and characters

Main
 Yoosuf Shafeeu as Niyaz
 Jamsheedha Ahmed as Ina
 Mohamed Manik as Husham
 Koyya Hassan Manik as Ina's father
 Aminath Rasheedha as Niyaz's mother

Recurring
 Mohamed Faisal as Adam
 Shahid Mohamed
 Zareer
 Mohamed Shan
 Ahmed Yaamin
 Aafee
 Nathif
 Mauroof Ahmed
 Hassan Naeem
 Qadir
 Ishaq Umar
 Mauroofa Hassan

Guest
 Suneetha Ali (special appearance in the song "Hiyy Magey Kiyaadhemey")
 Ahmed Shimau as Doctor

Episodes

Soundtrack

Release and reception
The first episode of the series was released on 4 November 2003, on the occasion of Ramadan 1424. Upon release, the series mostly received positive reviews from critics and audience alike. Apart from the performance of the actors, writer and director Fathimath Nahula's work to blend the social message in a love triangle was lauded by the film viewers.

References

Serial drama television series
Maldivian television shows
Maldivian web series